The Central District of Lali County is a district (bakhsh) in Lali County, Khuzestan Province, Iran. At the 2006 census, its population was 27,156, in 4,845 families.  The district has one city: Lali. The district has two rural districts (dehestan): Dasht-e Lali Rural District and Sadat Rural District.

References 

Lali County
Districts of Khuzestan Province